Victoria Regina or variation, may also refer to:

 Victoria Regina (or Victoria R.), a latinate form of address for queens-regnant named Victoria, see Queen Victoria (disambiguation)
 Victoria Regina (play), a 1934 stageplay by Laurence Housman about Queen Victoria
 Victoria Regina (film), a 1961 U.S. telemovie about Queen Victoria
 Paphiopedilum victoria-regina (P. victoria-regina), a species of orchid found in Sumatra
 Victoria amazonica (synonym: Victoria regina, V. regina), a species of water lily found in Guyana, and its national flower
 Victoria Regina Spivey (1906–1976), U.S. blues singer

See also

 Victoria Avenue (Regina, Saskatchewan), Canada
 Victoria Park, Regina, Saskatchewan, Canada
 Regina Victorias, several sports teams in Regina, Saskatchewa, Canada
 
 Victoria (disambiguation)
 Regina (disambiguation)